Ronald N. Germain is a scientist at the National Institutes of Health (NIH). He was elected a Member of the National Academy of Sciences in 2016.

References

Year of birth missing (living people)
Living people
National Institutes of Health people
Members of the United States National Academy of Sciences